Eurynora flavoeola is a moth of the subfamily Arctiinae. It was described by Rothschild in 1912. It is found in New Guinea.

References

 Natural History Museum Lepidoptera generic names catalog

Lithosiini
Moths described in 1912